Oichalia may refer to several places in Greece:

Oechalia (disambiguation), one of several ancient cities in Greece
Oichalia, Messenia, a municipality in Messenia
Oichalia, Trikala, a municipality in the Trikala regional unit